Seán Dunn(e) may refer to:
 Seán Dunne (politician) (1918–1969), Irish Labour Party politician
 Seán Dunne (poet) (1956–1995), Irish poet
 Seán Dunne (businessman) (born 1954), Irish businessman
Sean Dunn, musician in Five Eight (band)